Lieutenant General Nav Kumar Khanduri AVSM, VSM is a serving general officer in the Indian Army, and the incumbent General Officer Commanding-in-Chief of the Western Command since November 2021. He is the first officer from the Corps of Army Air Defence to become an army commander.

Biography 
An alumnus of Rashtriya Indian Military College, Dehradun and the National Defence Academy, Khadakwasla, Khanduri passed out with the 73rd Regular Course from the Indian Military Academy, Dehradun and was commissioned into 27 AD Missile Regiment (Amritsar Airfield) on 17 December 1983. He commanded an air defence brigade in Operation Rakshak and a mountain brigade in Operation Falcon. He served as an instructor at the College of Defence Management, Secunderabad and has held various staff appointments in field, high altitude and Integrated Headquarters postings.

Khanduri has also served with the Indian Military Training Team in Bhutan, as a United Nations Military Observer with the United Nations Transitional Authority in Cambodia and as Deputy Chief Integrated Service Support with the United Nations Mission in Ivory Coast. He commanded 15 Infantry Division, and was subsequently appointed Director General Operational Logistics and Strategic Movement before assuming command of XXXIII Corps in September 2019.

Awards and decorations
He was awarded the Vishisht Seva Medal in the 2016 Republic Day decorations list, the Ati Vishisht Seva Medal in the 2021 Republic Day decorations list and  the Param Vishisht Seva Medal in 2023.

Dates of rank

References 

Living people
Indian generals
National Defence Academy (India) alumni
Indian Military Academy alumni
Recipients of the Ati Vishisht Seva Medal
Recipients of the Vishisht Seva Medal
Military personnel from Uttarakhand
Year of birth missing (living people)
Defence Services Staff College alumni